Kobra is the name used by two supervillains published by DC Comics. The Jeffrey Burr incarnation of Kobra and his brother Jason first appeared in Kobra #1 (February 1976), and were created by Jack Kirby. Jason Burr debuted as Kobra in Faces of Evil: Kobra #1 (March 2009) by Ivan Brandon and Julian Lopez.

Publication history
Both Jeffrey and Jason Burr were created by Jack Kirby for a proposed DC Comics series called King Kobra, the first issue of which was both written and drawn by Kirby. This first issue then sat in DC inventory for over a year, during which time Kirby left the publisher to return to Marvel Comics.

Eventually the concept was handed over to writer Martin Pasko with orders to make a series out of it. Pasko was unimpressed with King Kobra, feeling it to be a throwaway idea churned out by Kirby as he was preparing to leave DC, and tried to make the best out of the assignment by whiting out all of Kirby's original dialogue, rescripting the issue, and having Pablo Marcos redraw some of the art. Now titled simply Kobra, the first issue of the series appeared in late 1975 (cover-dated February 1976). It was cancelled after seven issues, though the contents of the unpublished Kobra #8 saw print in DC Special Series #1. Pasko later reflected: "I wrote all of Kobra with my tongue firmly planted in my cheek—it was a preposterous exercise dumped in my lap, and it helped pay the rent on a very nice place in the Village".

Kobra is also featured in a January 2009 Faces of Evil one-shot, written by Ivan Brandon.

Fictional character biography

Jeffrey Franklin Burr
Kobra is an international terrorist and mad scientist who has crossed paths with the majority of Earth's costumed heroes during his attempts to usher in the Kali Yuga (an age of chaos). His real name is Jeffrey Franklin Burr, and he was born part of a set of conjoined twins, but was stolen at birth by the Cult of the Kobra God, since a prophecy claimed he would lead them to rule the world. Under their teaching, he became a dangerous warrior and a sadistic criminal mastermind. He led the cult into using advanced technology to menace the world. Followers of Kobra would frequently address their master as "Naja-Naja", "naja naja" being the binomial name for the Indian cobra. This later became "Nāga-Naga", a meaningless title which translates from the Sanskrit as "snake-snake". Whether this change was intentional or an error is not known.

Unbeknownst to the cult however, he had a psychic link to his twin brother, Jason, who knew nothing of Kobra. As a result, one felt what the other felt, including pain. Because of this, his brother was recruited by an international agency to help them combat Kobra. At first, Kobra was unable to kill or even hurt his brother; eventually, however, he used a device that "shut off" the psychic link, and gave him the chance to kill Jason. Kobra was subsequently haunted by visions of his brother. Whether it really was his ghost or just Kobra's imagination was never revealed.

In subsequent years, Kobra would clash with assorted superheroes, including Batman, whom he first met over a Lazarus Pit of his own creation. Kobra had learned to build modified Lazarus Pits, which allowed him to control the minds of those he killed and resurrected. Kobra is the only person in the DC universe ever to decipher the formula for the Lazarus Pits. Kobra had special concerns about Wonder Woman and sought to ensure her death, first by hiring a cartel of international assassins who were led secretly by corrupted UN Crisis Bureau chief Morgan Tracy (also Diana Prince's boss), then by kidnapping and irretrievably damaging environmental activist Deborah Domaine, forcibly transforming her into a new Cheetah, and ultimately, facing Wonder Woman in combat in Egypt, faking his own demise after being defeated by the Amazon Princess. A short while later his various Strike Force Kobra teams would fight two different incarnations of Batman's Outsiders. Kobra also fought the third Flash, the Suicide Squad led by Amanda Waller, the original incarnation of Checkmate, Captain Atom, a Superman whose personality had been swapped with Ambush Bug's by exposure to Red Kryptonite, and others. Kobra is one of a very small number of individuals that has the capability of defeating Batman in hand-to-hand combat, and actually did so on one occasion.

The only organization ever to rival Kobra in the old DC Universe (Pre-Crisis I) was SKULL. There were frequent recorded clashes between the two groups, the last occurring in Outsiders Annual #1 story "The Skull...The Serpent...and The Outsiders".

After the betrayal of his lover Lady Eve during the Strike Force Kobra fiasco, she split Kobra in two and established her own splinter group. In the Power Company: Sapphire #1 the Justice League rushes to San Diego to prevent disaster as two rival factions of the Kobra Cult prepared to go to war. One faction was led by Eve; the other was led by Kobra himself.

He kidnaps the former hero Air Wave and uses him to seize control of the world's media and satellite resources, intending to destroy a number of major world cities. However, in a demonstration of his power, he incidentally kills Terri Rothstein, Atom Smasher's mother, ensuring the Justice Society of America's involvement. Mrs. Rothstein's life would later be saved through time travel; Atom Smasher replacing her with the villain Extant so that the same number of people died in the plane crash that killed his mother.

He appeared again in JSA #45, which featured his trial. He shrugs off claims of terrorism, claiming to be an enlightened soul (a bodhisattva) trying to free souls from their karmic debt by random acts of violence. Following this, his followers threatened to kill the media outside the courthouse with bioengineered suicide bomb implants. Holding everyone hostage with this tactic, he was allowed by the JSA to escape, leading to an outraged Black Adam and Atom Smasher, who both subsequently choose to leave the team. In JSA #51, Atom Smasher, Black Adam, Northwind, and Brainwave track Kobra down to his headquarters in the Himalaya Mountains, Kobra's prophesied 'reign of darkness' as the world fell to the return of Eclipso and Obsidian having ended when Alex Moretz took control of Eclipso and Alan Scott managed to redeem Obsidian. After killing Kobra's guards, Black Adam rips his heart out and he died instantly.

Jason Burr
Jeffrey's twin brother Jason is re-animated by the Kobra Cult, possibly through the use of Kobra's Lazarus Pits. This involves the death of an entire facility of Checkmate agents, including several of Burr's old friends. Within the one-shot Jason reveals that he is re-structuring the organization and killing off all the old members. Before revealing himself as the new Kobra, Jason spent some time undercover as a Checkmate agent learning their secrets.

King Kobra
During the "Convergence" storyline, an unidentified Kobra leads the Kobra Cult under the alias of "King Kobra" and faces off against Red Hood and Arsenal.

After Lady Eve makes off with Dr. Helga Jace upon defeating Katana during the "DC Rebirth", King Kobra plans to raze a town in Markovia if they don't obey his commands. King Kobra interrogates Dr. Jace. When the Suicide Squad joins the fight and rescues Katana from Lady Eve, they and Katana find King Kobra outside Castle Markov. King Kobra later shows Dr. Jace the powers of the comatose girl that she was watching. King Kobra reveals that he caught an Aurakle as he plans to weaponize it. Before returning to the ship's command center, King Kobra leaves this task to Dr. Jace. During the Suicide Squad's fight with King Kobra's forces, Katana and Enchantress find that King Kobra had Dr. Jace fuse Violet Harper with the Aurakle as King Kobra activates the implant in Violet's neck only for Violet to tear it out as the Aurakle gains control of Violet's body. King Kobra, Katana, and Enchantress fight Violet who is now a vessel for the Aurakles under the name of Halo. After Katana uses the Soultaker on Lady Eve, King Kobra gets away.

In the "Watchmen" sequel "Doomsday Clock", King Kobra's cult has captured Creeper until he is "saved" by Black Adam.

Kobra organization

 The Kobra organization survived Jeffrey Burr's death, and has been gaining converts. In Identity Crisis, it was revealed that DCU prisoners (such as Slipknot) sometimes convert to the cult of Kobra, to the general disgust of the DC's supervillains.
 Like Ra's al Ghul, Kobra owned a hidden network of very specialized Lazarus Pits.
 Kobra apparently entertains many specialized sub-sections. One such section was the Blackadders, a group of ninja-like fanatics. In the past, Kobra operated an aggressive metahuman research and recruitment program. This program gave birth to both known versions of Strike Force Kobra.
 Kobra is currently active in the DCU as a terrorist organization with a religious bent. Upon the death of Jeffrey Burr, it underwent a power-struggle, with would-be leaders including King Snake, and (unwillingly) a schoolfriend of Tim Drake who apparently fitted the prophecy, but this has apparently settled: a new leader has emerged (possibly Eve who had split off with half of the old school Kobra). Under her, the organization now seeks to fulfill 'the prophecies of Kali Yuga'. It is actively being fought by the super-spy agency known as Checkmate.
 The new Kobra seems to be ranked by serpent type, low level members are Lanceheads, higher level members are called Nagas (Checkmate vol. 2 #4), the highest level shown are the Bestowed, mystics who specialize in Blood Magic.
 Kobra later researched every villain that ever fought Batman and how they each acquired their respective powers. After obtaining some test subjects, Kobra had his researchers use this information to transform them into Strike Force Kobra to serve the Kobra organization.

Other versions
 In Kingdom Come, an immortal Lord Naga/Jeffrey Burr is a part of the Mankind Liberation Front led by Lex Luthor.
 King Kobra appears in the Lil Gotham series. Kobra King once stole the Jade Sword. Although they escaped Gotham City, he'd be tracked and captured by Batman and his mysterious partner, revealed to be Alfred. Years later, they would again steel the Jade Sword. While they were chased by Katana and Robin, they quickly subdued the heroes. Batman's ex-partner would come to their aid and defeat Kobra.

In other media

Television
 A futuristic incarnation of the Kobra organization appears in series set in the DC Animated Universe (DCAU), with various members voiced by Corey Burton, Kerrigan Mahan, Gary Anthony Sturgis, and Keith Szarabajka. This version of the group is a global terrorist organization primarily made up of scientists with an obsession for reptiles and dinosaurs, envisioning the latter as the only lifeform capable of ruling the world and seeking out ways to splice humanity with dinosaur DNA. To better emulate the species they admire, Kobra has conducted tests on kidnapped people, turned themselves into reptilian creatures, and used cutting edge technology for robberies, extortion and terrorism. 
 Kobra first appears in Batman Beyond. Introduced in the episode "Plague", they develop a super-virus capable of complete biological devastation. After hiring False-Face to smuggle the virus into Neo-Gotham, Kobra operatives break into Gotham Plastics to expose millions of cred-cards with the virus and spread it throughout the city. As a back-up plan, they also turn False-Face into a carrier for the virus. Kobra planned to demand a ransom of 10 billion credits, but are intercepted and foiled by Stalker and Batman. In the two-part episode "Curse of the Kobra", Kobra is revealed to have been working on genetically-engineering the perfect leader for their organization, whom they named Zander (voiced by Alexis Denisof), as they lacked cohesive leadership. Throughout his gestation, infancy, and adolescence, Kobra groomed Zander to lead them. After coming of age, he leads the organization in stealing dinosaur DNA to transform their operatives into dinosaur hybrids. As their new hybrids were cold-blooded, Kobra also steals a thermal bomb, intending to detonate it inside a volcano that leads to the Earth's core and raise the planet's temperature. However, they are foiled by Batman, Max Gibson, and Kairi Tanaga, and Zander is lost in the ensuing battle. In flashbacks depicted in the episode "Unmasked", Batman revealed his secret identity to a young boy and inadvertently made him a target of Kobra. While the terrorists captured the latter and used a memory machine in an attempt to learn Batman's identity, the boy was able to deceive them by replacing Batman's face with that of his favorite action figure.
 Kobra appears in the Static Shock episode "Future Shock", with its new, unnamed leader voiced by Lance Henriksen. After their leader is arrested, Kobra captures Static to ostensibly negotiate a trade while secretly helping their leader escape. Once he is freed, the Kobra leader attempts to kill Static, only to be foiled by Batman and Static's time-traveling younger self, who frees the latter's older counterpart so he can defeat Kobra.
 The Kobra cult appears in the teaser for the Batman: The Brave and the Bold episode "Requiem for a Scarlet Speedster!", with their leader voiced by Robin Atkin Downes. They attempt to sacrifice a young woman in preparation for world domination, only to run afoul of Batman and the Outsiders. Though the heroes manage to defeat Kobra and save the woman, Batman learns the Outsiders forgot to destroy a nearby bridge that would have prevented Kobra reinforcements from arriving.
 The Jeffrey Burr incarnation of Kobra and his cult appear in the Young Justice episode "Drop Zone", voiced by Arnold Vosloo. This version is more calculating than his comics counterpart and is a martial artist. He and his cult come into conflict with Bane over Santa Prisca as well combining the latter's Venom drug with the Blockbuster formula to create a more powerful and permanent transformation for the Light. Kobra and his cult end up fighting Bane and the Team, with Kobra himself fighting Robin before escaping.
 Jason Burr appears in Beware the Batman, voiced by Matthew Lillard. This version is the inventor of the Ion Cortex, a device that could potentially manage the world's power. Introduced in the episode "Safe", Batman and Katana work to protect Burr from the League of Assassins after they target him and the Ion Cortex. All the while, Burr becomes infatuated with Katana. After being attacked and possessed by League of Assassins member Cypher, Burr secretly gets into contact with the League's leader, Lady Shiva, and finishes the Ion Cortex for her. While Batman and Katana eventually Burr from Cypher's control so he can shut down the Ion Cortex, Shiva uses the Soultaker sword on him before he can finish.

Film
The Jeffrey Burr incarnation of Kobra appears in Batman: Soul of the Dragon, voiced by Josh Keaton. This version was kidnapped and brainwashed by the Kobra cult as a child to be their savior. In the present, he plans to unlock a gate at Nanda Parbat to unleash the serpent god Nāga by offering children's souls via the Soul Breaker sword. After his forces are defeated by Lady Shiva, Richard Dragon, Ben Turner, and Batman, the heroes plead with a desperate Burr to reject Kobra. Ultimately, Burr stabs himself with Soul Breaker, killing him and unleashing Nāga.

Miscellaneous
 The Jeffrey Burr incarnation of Kobra appears in issues #16 and #17 of the Young Justice tie-in comic book. He plots to perform a ritual on his twin brother Dr. Jason Burr, only to be interrupted by Batman, the Flash, Green Arrow, Robin, Kid Flash, and Artemis. Despite this, Kobra attempts to resume the ritual by feeding Jason's blood to a snake before drinking it himself along with the Blockbuster formula. As he gains snake-like abilities, Jason is absorbed into his dagger. However, Kobra is pricked by the dagger, undoing his mutation and restoring Jason.
 The first King Kobra appears in Batman '66.
 An alternate universe version of Kobra appears in the Justice League: Gods and Monsters Chronicles episode "Big", voiced by Bruce Thomas.

References

External links
 Kobra at the DCU Guide
 Kobra at Don Markstein's Toonopedia.  from the original on December 2, 2015.
 Strike Force Kobra at DC Comics Wiki
 Strike Force Kobra at Comic Vine
 Strike Force Kobra at Angelfire

DC Comics martial artists
1976 comics debuts
Characters created by Jack Kirby
Comic book terrorist organizations
Comics characters introduced in 1976
DC Comics scientists
DC Comics supervillain teams
DC Comics titles
Fictional cults
Fictional cult leaders
Fictional mass murderers
Fictional organized crime groups
Fictional secret societies
Twin characters in comics
Supervillains with their own comic book titles